Ghost on Ghost is the fifth full-length studio album by Iron & Wine, released April 16, 2013 via 4AD (worldwide) and Nonesuch in the US. The album's title is taken from the lyrics of "Grace for Saints and Ramblers" and the cover is taken from photographer Barbara Crane's series "Private Views." Ghost on Ghost exhibits jazz, pop, and R&B influences and contains a more relaxed style and approach in comparison to Beam's previous two albums, which he felt contained an "anxious tension" he wanted to move away from.

The album debuted at No. 26 on Billboard 200, and No. 9 on Rock Albums, selling 16,000 copies in its first week.  The album has sold 51,000 copies in the United States as of June 2015.

Track listing

Personnel
Iron & Wine
Sam Beam – vocals, guitars
Rob Burger – acoustic and electric pianos, organ (1, 4, 6, 11, 12), clavinet (4), celesta (5), hammered dulcimer (4), jew's harp (4), tubular bells (10)
Tony Garnier – bass (1, 2, 4, 5, 6, 7, 10, 12)
Tony Scherr – upright bass (3, 8, 9), ukulele bass (4), guitar (3)
Brian Blade – drums & percussion (1, 2, 4, 5, 6, 7, 10, 11, 12)
Kenny Wollesen – drums & percussion (1, 3, 5, 7, 8, 9), bowed vibraphone (9)
Paul Niehaus – pedal steel guitar (2, 7, 9, 12)

Chart positions

References

Iron & Wine albums
2013 albums
Albums produced by Brian Deck
Nonesuch Records albums
4AD albums